The men's 3000 metres steeplechase event at the 1967 Pan American Games was held in Winnipeg on 30 July.

Results

References

Athletics at the 1967 Pan American Games
1967